Aleksandr Gushchin may refer to:
Aleksandr Gushchin (footballer) (b. 1966), Russian football coach and former player
Oleksandr Hushchyn (b. 1966), retired Ukrainian football player